Gagarine, also known as Gagarin, is a 2020 French drama film directed by Fanny Liatard and Jérémy Trouilh, in their feature directorial debut. It centres around Cité Gagarine, a housing project in Ivry-sur-Seine, on the south of Paris, where the film was shot right before its demolition.

The film was selected for the 2020 Cannes Film Festival. It was nominated for the European Discovery at the 33rd European Film Awards.

Synopsis
Youri, a 16-year-old boy living in Cité Gagarine, a housing project in Ivry-sur-Seine, protests the planned demolition of the community.

Cast
 Alséni Bathily as Youri
 Lyna Khoudri as Diana
 Jamil McCraven as Houssam
 Finnegan Oldfield as Dali
 Farida Rahouadj as Fari
 Denis Lavant as Gérard

Production
Gagarine is an expansion of the directors' 2015 short of the same name, their first film. They first interviewed residents of Cité Gagarine at the request of architects who were studying the possible demolition of the building, which inspired them to write a fictional film set in the project.

Release
Gagarine was included in the First Features section of the official selection of the 2020 Cannes Film Festival, which was cancelled due to the COVID-19 pandemic. It was screened for press and industry in an online edition of the Cannes Marché du Film in June 2020. It was subsequently screened at the Zurich Film Festival on 26 September 2020. It was first theatrically released in France on 23 June 2021.

Reception

Box office
Gagarine has grossed a worldwide total of $553,042.

Critical response
On review aggregator Rotten Tomatoes, the film holds an approval rating of 95% based on 44 reviews, with an average rating of 7.8/10. The website's critics consensus reads, "Balancing whimsy-tinged magic realism against serious themes of community and displacement, Gagarine is as bracingly original as it is ultimately poignant." On Metacritic, the film holds a score of 74 out of 100, based on 12 critics, indicating "generally favorable reviews".

References

External links
 
 
 

2020 films
2020 directorial debut films
2020 drama films
2020s French-language films
French drama films
Films set in Île-de-France
Films shot in Île-de-France
Magic realism films
2020s French films